Derek O'Connor (born 8 January 1955) is a Scottish footballer, who played as a forward for several Scottish clubs, including St Johnstone and Heart of Midlothian.

O'Connor lives in Edinburgh with his wife Karen (married November 1974) has two daughters, Ashley (born 1981) and Jenna (born 1984) and six grandchildren.

References

External links

1955 births
Living people
Footballers from Edinburgh
Association football forwards
Scottish footballers
East Fife F.C. players
St Johnstone F.C. players
Heart of Midlothian F.C. players
Berwick Rangers F.C. players
Livingston F.C. players
Dunfermline Athletic F.C. players
Brechin City F.C. players
Broxburn Athletic F.C. players
Penicuik Athletic F.C. players
Scottish Football League players